Janine Crispin (25 June 1911 – 18 June 2001) was a French film and television actress.

Selected filmography
 Court Waltzes (1933)
 High and Low (1933)
 Song of Farewell (1934)
 Second Bureau (1935)
 The Secret of Polichinelle (1936)
 Moutonnet (1936)
 Taras Bulba (1936)
 Le Bataillon du ciel (1947)
 At the Grand Balcony (1949)
 Les Rois maudits (1972) as Eliabel Cressay (miniseries)

References

Bibliography
 Goble, Alan. The Complete Index to Literary Sources in Film. Walter de Gruyter, 1999.

External links

1911 births
2001 deaths
French film actresses
French television actresses
Actresses from Paris
20th-century French women